Bullying is abusive social interaction between peers can include aggression, harassment, and violence. Bullying is typically repetitive and enacted by those who are in a position of power over the victim. A growing body of research illustrates a significant relationship between bullying and emotional intelligence.

Emotional intelligence (EI) is a set of abilities related to the understanding, use and management of emotion as it relates to one's self and others. Mayer et al., (2008) defines the dimensions of overall EI as: "accurately perceiving emotion, using emotions to facilitate thought, understanding emotion, and managing emotion". The concept combines emotional and intellectual processes. Lower emotional intelligence appears to be related to involvement in bullying, as the bully and/or the victim of bullying. EI seems to play an important role in both bullying behavior and victimization in bullying; given that EI is illustrated to be malleable, EI education could greatly improve bullying prevention and intervention initiatives.

Childhood

Bullying is the most prevalent form of violence in schools and has lasting consequences into adulthood. Increased concern regarding school bullying has been raised in part due to publicized suicides of childhood victims. Around 40% of middle school children are directly involved in bullying at least once a week according to the National Center of Education Statistics. Pre-adolescent research confirms such a negative relationship between trait EI and bullying behavior; bullying behavior is negatively associated with  total empathy and more specifically, the EI dimension of cognitive empathy, which is the ability to understand or take on the emotional experiences and perspectives of others. It was found that adolescent bullying peer relations are also significantly negatively correlated with the dimension of  EI that was conceptualized by Lomas et al. (2012) as Understanding the Emotions of Others. While the term naming the dimension varies within the research, the dimension of EI that appears to have the strongest inverse relationship with enacting  bullying behavior throughout the literature is one's ability to understand the emotional experience of other people.

Because bullying behavior in school-aged children is related to lower levels of understanding of other's emotions, one theory is that children who exhibit bullying behaviors are not able to fully understand the impact that they have on their victims. Indeed, when differentiating between the different components of empathy, it is the cognitive component that bullies seem to have the most deficit in. In addition to the inability to relate to the emotions of others, research also suggests that those who engage in bullying behavior may also lack proper skills in dealing with their own emotions, another aspect of EI often referred to as emotional facilitation or self-efficacy.

The poor use of emotions is found to be significant in predicting problem behavior among adolescents, such as aggression, which can be characteristic in bullying behavior. In this way, the ability to understand and manage one's own emotions may play an important role in preventing children from engaging in bullying behavior. For example, in a study among adolescent girls, it was found that better management of stress could prevent the perpetuation of aggression and violence.

Workplace

Workplace bullying is reported to be far more prevalent than perhaps commonly thought. Workplace bullying seems to be particularly widespread in healthcare organizations; 80% of nurses report experiencing workplace bullying.

Similar to the school environment for children, the work environment typically places groups of adult peers together in a shared space on a regular basis. In such a situation, social interactions and relationships are of great importance to the function of the organizational structure and in pursuing goals. The emotional consequences of bullying put an organization at risk of losing victimized employees. Bullying also contributes to a negative work environment, is not conducive to necessary cooperation and can lessen productivity at various levels.

Bullying in the workplace is associated with negative responses to stress. The ability to manage emotions, especially emotional stress, seems to be a consistently important factor in different types of bullying. The workplace in general can be a stressful environment, so a negative way of coping with stress or an inability to do so can be particularly damning.

Workplace bullies may have high social intelligence and low emotional intelligence. In this context, bullies tend to rank high on the social ladder and are adept at influencing others. The combination of high social intelligence and low empathy is conducive to manipulative behavior, such that Hutchinson (2013) describes workplace bullying to be. In working groups where employees have low EI, workers can be persuaded to engage in unethical behavior. With the bullies' persuasion, the work group is socialized in a way that rationalizes the behavior, and makes the group tolerant or supportive of the bullying. Hutchinson & Hurley (2013) make the case that EI and leadership skills are both necessary to bullying intervention in the workplace, and illustrates the relationship between EI, leadership and reductions in bullying. EI and ethical behavior among other members of the work team have been shown to have a significant impact on ethical behavior of nursing teams. Higher EI is linked to improvements in the work environment and is an important moderator between conflict and reactions to conflict in the workplace. The self-awareness and self-management dimensions of EI have both been illustrated to have strong positive correlations with effective leadership and the specific leadership ability to build healthy work environments and work culture. A bad environment in the workplace (with bullying cases, for instance) can negatively affect the organization's efficiency and costs.

Theoretical contributions to the relationship

Malevolent creativity
Given lower emotional intelligence, it is also possible that many bullies are more malevolently creative. When original, the acts of aggression and abuse found in both childhood and adult bullying are considered examples of malevolent creativity (MC). Findings suggest that individuals lower in EI conceive more malevolently creative solutions, which theoretically leads to more malevolently creative behaviors. It is conjectured that people with lower emotional intelligence may not see the impropriety in malevolently creative ideas or disregard how others would perceive them, and thus they have less issue with disclosing such ideas.  Given the hypothesis that more malevolently creative solutions should lead to more malevolently creative behaviors, this theory makes sense in light of the deficit in cognitive empathy found in bullying behavior.

Callous and unemotional traits

There may also be a subtype of bully that is high in callous and unemotional traits (CU). CU traits include some of the discussed deficits in EI such as lack of empathy, as well as other traits such as a lack of guilt, shallow capacity for emotion and poor behavioral modulation when faced with punishment.  Given that children who bully often have conduct problems, and CU traits are often co-occurring with conduct problems, Viding et al., (2009)  investigated the relationship between CU and bullying behavior.  Given that previous research suggests children with conduct problems fall into subtypes of those with high CU traits and those without, it was possible that this creates a distinction among bullies.  Higher CU was independently correlated to direct bullying, which is associated with lack of empathy, while indirect bullying is not.   When combined with conduct problems, CU increased the risk of direct and indirect bullying behaviors. Bullies high in CU traits will probably be resistant to many of the interventions successful with bullies who are not. Although a defining characteristic of CU is a lack of empathy, which overlaps with bullies deficits in empathy as highlighted above, the other characteristics of the concept would make bullies high in CU less malleable than those who simply have lower EI.

Victimization and emotional intelligence

Being bullied can have a negative impact on the victim's life: Bullied children may go on to be maladjusted socially and emotionally, and worsen in behavior. Adults who are bullied in the workplace may have deteriorated self-esteem, suffer from isolation and become fearful and avoidant after being victimized. They may disengage and withdraw from their work community.  Both child and adult victims are at greater risk of developing mental pathology. EI is found to be a significant predictor of variance in adolescent peer victimization in bullying and also has a negative correlation with adolescent bullying. Victim peer relations showed strong negative correlations with the emotional management and facilitation dimensions of EI conceptualized as Emotional Management and Control and Emotions Direct Cognitions respectively, both of which made significant semi-partial contributions to the overall model of Emotional Intelligence. These results indicate that victims may have less ability to handle their emotions or to use them to make decisions in response. The inability to manage one's own emotions can lead to rejection, or further rejection, from peers which can help perpetuate victimization and further damage a victim's social skills; peer relationships and support are influential on emotional adjustment. In workplace bullying the workgroup's rejection isolates the victim and causes guilt and fear, causing withdrawal from the group and reducing opportunities for social support.  In addition to self-efficacy, victimization is also found to be negatively correlated to cognitive and affective empathy.

Bully-victims
There is a strong positive relationship between engaging in bullying behaviors and having been victimized by bullying behaviors. This is both a common finding in review of the research and is in tune with what is commonly observed during human adolescence; often victims of bullying go on to become bullies themselves. A history of victimization often leads to a perpetuation of similar behavior. Having low emotional intelligence increases the likelihood of being both a victim and a bully, which are apparently not mutually exclusive roles. This dual status is sometimes referred to as being a bully-victim. Bully-victims seem to be the most troubled. They tend to exhibit more emotional issues like low impulse control and self-esteem as well as social issues, such as the inability to interpret social cues or make friends. They may begin with pre-existing issues with behavior and emotion, and more often come from dysfunctional families.  Childhood bully-victims also fare worse in adulthood than 'pure' bullies or victims. Across multiple areas, bully-victims had the greatest impairment in adult functioning and worse health outcomes including the diagnosis of a serious illness or psychiatric disorder. Bully-victims had similarly poor outcomes in educational achievement as bullies and also shared similar likelihood to some of the measured risk behaviors, all status groups showed impairment in some categories like wealth attainment and social relationships. When controlling for other factors pure bullies are no longer at an elevated risk across all these categories, which bullying is predictive of regardless of victim status, though bully-victims and victims remain at higher risk. While some dimensions of EI seem more predictive of one status or the other (that of the bully or the victim), there are dimensions of EI, such as empathy and self-efficacy, that have significant negative relationships with both. Additionally, EI as a whole is significant in predicting for victim status. Thus, victims may also be deficient in the dimensions of EI that correlate to becoming a bully, a risk that could be expected to be exacerbated by the damage to one's psycho-social health due to being a victim. Students who experience bullying often have a harder time adapting healthy relationships when they get older. It has been found that there is a negative correlation between bullying and emotional intelligence. People with more emotional intelligence are able moderate the effects of the bullying they suffer in the workplace and still work efficiently.

Interventions

The most effective bullying interventions will likely be those that are dynamic and theory-driven in approach. Conventional intervention efforts have had small impact and mixed results in reducing bullying among children. These earlier models were based on descriptive data and focused on correcting the behavior of children who were already bullies or victims. Domino (2013) notes a theoretical shift from focus on deficit-based intervention to strength-based intervention.

Take The Lead (TTL) is a curriculum for middle school students combining social emotional learning (SEL) and positive youth development (PYD). SEL is a process of building social competence and emotional intelligence through a set of pertinent skills. PYD is a SEL program that uses social end emotional learning to promote healthy outcomes for the children by developing, then applying, the learned individual and group skills. Meta-analysis of 213 studies linked SEL to significant improvement in interpersonal relationships, social skills, behavior issues, substance abuse and aggression. Positive contributions to the impact of SEL were found to be made by the development and application of social skills, social support and positive behavior reinforcement. Meta-analysis of 25 programs illustrated significant positive changes in interpersonal skills, self-control, problem-solving and both peer and adult relationships as a result of PYD as well as significant decrease in negative risk behaviors such as substance abuse, acts of aggression, truancy and risky sexual behavior. The most important elements of PYD for positive outcomes in the analysis were incorporation of emotional intelligence and self-efficacy, and the development of pro-social norms. Domino (2013) noted that prior research supported SEL and PYD being applied to youth risk behaviors and that their effectiveness was found to be positive and sustainable, however not much research had been done on a link between the constructs and reduction of bullying specifically. The study then investigates a model, TTL, that combines the SEL and PYD frameworks, strengthened by a social support system. TTL consists of 16 lessons, taught once a week for 16 weeks, during regular 45 minute class periods by teachers that are trained for a minimum of 6 hours.
The lessons are accompanied by a goal; for instance, the goal accompanying lesson 10 on Assertiveness is "Differentiate between assertive, passive, and aggressive communication styles, and practice assertive and empathic interrelating.". Every lesson includes knowledge, skill and application components so that students are able to practice the learned skills in their life outside of the classroom. A TTL training workshop is offered to the parents of participants and a letter is sent to the parents at the beginning of each segment with information about the lesson, goals and accompanying activities. Domino (2013) applied the TTL intervention to 7th grade students and measured changes in bullying and victim behavior using a quantitative pretest-posttest control group cohort design. Sum scores for bullying and victimization were obtained before and at the completion of the intervention using the PRQ, a self-report survey, completed anonymously.

Resilience

Beyond preventing bullying, it is also important to consider how interventions based on EI are important in the case that bullying will occur. Increasing EI may be an important step in trying to foster resilience among victims. When a person faces stress and adversity, especially of a repetitive nature, their ability to adapt is an important factor in whether they have a more positive or negative outcome. Resilient individuals are those who are considered to have positive developmental outcomes in light of their negative experiences, such as bullying. Sapouna & Wolke (2013) examined adolescents who illustrated resilience to bullying and found some interesting gendered differences, with higher behavioral resilience found among girls and higher emotional resilience found among boys. Despite these differences, they still implicated internal resources and negative emotionality in either encouraging or being negatively associated with resilience to bullying respectively and urged for the targeting of psychosocial skills as a form of intervention. One factor that is important in resilience is the regulation of one's own emotions. Schneider et al. (2013) found that emotional perception was significant in facilitating lower negative emotionality during stress and Emotional Understanding facilitated resilience and has a positive correlation with positive affect.

Notes

References

Further reading
Books
 Lubit RH Coping with Toxic Managers, Subordinates ... and Other Difficult People: Using Emotional Intelligence to Survive and Prosper (2003)
 Plaford GR Bullying and the Brain: Using Cognitive and Emotional Intelligence to Help Kids Cope (2006)

Academic articles
 Sheehan M  "Workplace bullying: responding with some emotional intelligence", International Journal of Manpower Vol 20 Issue 1/2 Pages 57–69 (1999)
 Vogel SW The relationship between bullying and emotional intelligence Northcentral University 2006
 Oluyinka OA Mediatory Role Of Emotional Intelligence On The Relationship Between Self-Reported Misconduct And Bullying Behaviour Among Secondary School Students  - IFE PsychologIA, 2009 FULL TEXT
 Roundy CA Workplace bullying: Investigating the potential link with emotional intelligence  University of Phoenix, 2008
 Jacobson R Review of Bullying and the Brain: Using Cognitive and Emotional Intelligence to Help Kids Cope - The Teachers College Record, 2006
 Harris A An Investigation of the Relationship between Emotional Literacy and Bullying - 2009 
 Bullying: The Effectiveness of a Direct Emotional Literacy 
 Emotional literacy interventions in the prevention of bullying within the pastoral system of schools

Bullying
Workplace bullying
Emotional intelligence
Abuse
Psychological concepts
Interpersonal conflict
Popular psychology
Intelligence
Emotion
Emotional issues